Russell "Rusty" Schieber (born  in Ripon, Wisconsin) is an American curler and curling coach.

As a coach of American wheelchair curling team he participated in 2018 Winter Paralympics and 2022 Winter Paralympics.

He is National Wheelchair Coach of USA Curling Association.

Record as a coach of national teams

References

External links

 
 Video: 

Living people
1962 births
People from Montello, Wisconsin
American male curlers
American curling coaches